Sarah Ann Hildebrandt (born September 23, 1993) is an American freestyle wrestler. She won one of the bronze medals in the women's 50 kg event at the 2020 Summer Olympics in Tokyo, Japan. She is a three-time medalist at the World Wrestling Championships and a gold medalist at the Pan American Games. She is also a six-time gold medalist at the Pan American Wrestling Championships.

Career 

In 2013, she represented the United States at the Summer Universiade in Kazan, Russia without winning a medal. In 2016, she competed in the 55 kg event at the World Wrestling Championships in Budapest, Hungary without winning a medal. She lost her first match against Mayu Mukaida of Japan and she entered the repechage where she lost her match against Ramóna Galambos of Hungary. In 2017, at the Golden Grand Prix Ivan Yarygin 2017 held in Krasnoyarsk, Russia, she won the silver medal in the women's 55 kg event.

In 2018, she won one of the bronze medals in the women's 53 kg event at the Klippan Lady Open in Klippan, Sweden. She also competed in the women's freestyle competition of the 2018 Wrestling World Cup. At the 2018 Pan American Wrestling Championships held in Lima, Peru, she won the gold medal in the women's 53 kg event. In the final, she defeated Luisa Valverde of Ecuador. At the 2018 World Wrestling Championships held in Budapest, Hungary, she won the silver medal in the women's 53 kg event.

In 2019, at the Golden Grand Prix Ivan Yarygin held in Krasnoyarsk, Russia, she won the gold medal in the women's 53 kg event. At the 2019 Pan American Wrestling Championships held in Buenos Aires, Argentina, she won the gold medal in the same event. In June 2019, she won against Katherine Shai at the Final X: Lincoln event held in Lincoln, Nebraska. Later that year, she won the gold medal in the women's 53 kg event at the 2019 Pan American Games held in Lima, Peru. In the final, she defeated Betzabeth Argüello of Venezuela. In the same year, she also competed in the women's freestyle competition of the 2019 Wrestling World Cup.

In 2021, she won the gold medal in the women's 50 kg event at the Grand Prix de France Henri Deglane 2021 held in Nice, France. She also won the gold medal in this event at the Pan American Wrestling Championships held in Guatemala City, Guatemala.

At the 2020 Pan American Wrestling Olympic Qualification Tournament held in March 2020, she earned a quota place for the United States, and in April 2021 at the U.S. Team Trials, she secured her place to compete at the 2020 Summer Olympics in Tokyo, Japan. She lost her semi-final in a close match after leading 7–2 mid-way through her bout and 7–6 with only 12 seconds to go, but her opponent Sun Yanan of China won a 4-point throw at the death and Hildebrandt lost. In her bronze medal match she defeated Oksana Livach of Ukraine.

Two months after the Olympics, she won the silver medal in the women's 50 kg event at the 2021 World Wrestling Championships held in Oslo, Norway. She won the gold medal in her event at the 2022 Pan American Wrestling Championships held in Acapulco, Mexico. She also won the gold medal in her event at the 2022 Tunis Ranking Series event held in Tunis, Tunisia.

She won one of the bronze medals in the women's 50kg event at the 2022 World Wrestling Championships held in Belgrade, Serbia.

Championships and accomplishments

References

External links 

 
 
 
 

Living people
1993 births
People from Granger, Indiana
American female sport wrestlers
World Wrestling Championships medalists
Competitors at the 2013 Summer Universiade
Wrestlers at the 2019 Pan American Games
Medalists at the 2019 Pan American Games
Pan American Games medalists in wrestling
Pan American Games gold medalists for the United States
Pan American Wrestling Championships medalists
Wrestlers at the 2020 Summer Olympics
Medalists at the 2020 Summer Olympics
Olympic bronze medalists for the United States in wrestling
20th-century American women
21st-century American women